Ruth Colker (born 1956) is an American legal scholar working as the Distinguished Professor and Heck Faust Chair in Constitutional Law at the Ohio State University Moritz College of Law. She was awarded the 2009 Distinguished University Professor by the university.

Education 
Colker earned a Bachelor of Arts degree in social studies from Radcliffe College in 1978 and a Juris Doctor from Harvard Law School in 1981.

Career 
Colker's scholarship focuses on constitutional and disability law. She spent four years as a trial attorney in the United States Department of Justice Civil Rights Division. Prior to joining Ohio State University, she worked as a professor at the Tulane University Law School, University of Toronto Faculty of Law, University of Pittsburgh School of Law, and George Washington University Law School.

References

Year of birth missing (living people)
Living people
Ohio State University faculty
American lawyers
Harvard Law School alumni

Radcliffe College alumni
1956 births
United States Department of Justice lawyers
United States Department of Justice officials
Tulane University Law School faculty
University of Pittsburgh faculty
George Washington University Law School faculty